The Old State Bank, also known as the Second State Bank, Vincennes Branch, is a historic bank building located at Vincennes, Knox County, Indiana.  It was built in 1838, and is a -story, Greek Revival style brick building. The building measures 36 feet wide and 48 feet deep. The projecting temple form front facade features four two-story, Doric order columns. The building is topped by a dome with cupola and windows that provide light to the main banking room.  The building was restored in 1965.

It was added to the National Register of Historic Places in 1974.  It is located in the Vincennes Historic District.

References

Vincennes, Indiana
Bank buildings on the National Register of Historic Places in Indiana
Greek Revival architecture in Indiana
Commercial buildings completed in 1838
Buildings and structures in Knox County, Indiana
National Register of Historic Places in Knox County, Indiana
Individually listed contributing properties to historic districts on the National Register in Indiana